Bojan Jovanović (born 31 January 1980) is a Croatian fencer. At the 2012 Summer Olympics held in London, United Kingdom, he competed in the men's foil, but was defeated in the first round.

References

Croatian male foil fencers
Living people
Olympic fencers of Croatia
Fencers at the 2012 Summer Olympics
1980 births
European Games competitors for Croatia
Fencers at the 2015 European Games
20th-century Croatian people
21st-century Croatian people